The 1874 United States elections occurred in the middle of Republican President Ulysses S. Grant's second term, during the Third Party System. Members of the 44th United States Congress were chosen in this election. The election took place during the Reconstruction Era, and many Southerners were barred from voting. Colorado joined the union during the 44th Congress. Democrats took control of a chamber of Congress for the first time since the start of the Civil War, winning a huge number of seats from House Republicans. However, the Republicans retained a majority in the Senate. The election marked the first occurrence of the six-year itch phenomenon, in which a president's party lost many Congressional seats during the president's second mid-term election.

The Panic of 1873, a series of scandals, and an unpopular Congressional pay raise all damaged the Republican Party's brand. With the passage of the Reconstruction amendments, the importance of the parties' roles in the Civil War also receded in the minds of many. Though Republicans won governorships in Northern states such as Pennsylvania, the election increased Democratic power in the South, which it later dominated after the end of Reconstruction.

In the House, Democrats won massive gains when the Republicans lost a total of 92 seats (the third-largest swing in the history of the House, and the second-largest House loss by the Republican Party), turning a dominant Republican majority into a similarly dominant Democratic majority.

In the Senate, Democrats picked up several seats, but Republicans retained a commanding majority.

See also
1874–75 United States House of Representatives elections
1874–75 United States Senate elections

References

1874 elections in the United States
1874
United States midterm elections